Pyrzyce  (formerly ) is a town in Pomerania, north-western Poland. As of 2007, it had 13,331 inhabitants.

Pyrzycw is the capital of the Pyrzyce County in West Pomeranian Voivodeship (since 1999), which was previously located in Szczecin Voivodeship (1975–1998).

History

An anonymous medieval document of about 850, called Bavarian Geographer, mentions the tribe of Prissani having 70 strongholds (Prissani civitates LXX). In the early 12th century, the town was part of Poland, then, as a result of the fragmentation of Poland, it was part of the Duchy of Pomerania.

The settlement was first mentioned in 1124 by bishop Otto von Bamberg, who
baptized the first Pomeranians here. Throughout the German Ostsiedlung the oldest church was built in 1250, an Augustinian cloister in 1256 and a monastery of the Franciscan order in 1281.

In 1263 the town received Magdeburg law. By the Contract of Pyritz of March 26, 1493 the Dukes of Pomerania recognized the right of succession of the House of Brandenburg. A large fire destroyed almost the whole town in 1496. Pyritz was the first town in Pomerania to implement the Lutheran Reformation in 1524.

In 1634, during the Thirty Years' War, it was again largely destroyed by a conflagration. After the death of the last Pomeranian Duke in 1637, the Swedes took over the town. In 1653 the town became part of the Brandenburg-Prussian province of Pomerania following the Peace of Westphalia (1648) and the Treaty of Stettin (1653), along within the rest of Farther Pomerania.

In 1818, the town became the seat of the district administration (Kreis Pyritz) and was connected to the railway system in 1882. As part of Prussia the town was located in unified Germany of 1871.

At the end of World War II the Soviet Red Army conquered the town during the Pomeranian Offensive. Bombardment of Pyritz by Soviet artillery began on February 1, 1945, and achieved maximum intensity on February 27, when attacks by heavy artillery destroyed the old town. Following the post-war boundary changes, Pyrzyce became part of Poland; the local population was expelled and replaced by ethnic Poles.

Number of inhabitants by year

Famous people
 Sir Trevor Corry (1724–1780), British diplomat, died in Pyritz
 Karl Gützlaff (1803–1851), a German Lutheran missionary to the Far East
 Salomon Neumann (1819–1908), surgeon and founder of "Hochschule für die Wissenschaft des Judentums" (Berlin)
 August Munckel (1837–1903), German politician
 Gustav Jacobsthal (1845–1912), composer and full-time professor of historical musicology
 Gustav Hirschfeld (1847–1895), a German classical archaeologist
 Otto Gerstenberg (1848-1935), a German businessman, mathematician and art collector
 Otto Hintze (1861–1940), a German historian of public administration
 Margarete Neumann (1917–2002), a German writer and lyrical poet
 Danuta Bartoszek (born 1961), a former long-distance runner; competed for Canada at the 1996 Summer Olympics
 Paweł Januszewski (born 1972), a retired hurdler, represented Poland in the 1996 and 2000 Summer Olympics
 Magda Toeters (born 1986), a Dutch swimmer, won silver at the 2012 Summer Paralympics

Twin towns

External links
 Official city website 
 Satellite photo from Google Maps

References

Cities and towns in West Pomeranian Voivodeship
Pyrzyce County